Zindanmuruq (also, Zindanmurug and Zindan-Muruq) is a village and municipality in the Qusar Rayon of Azerbaijan.  It has a population of 705.

References 

Populated places in Qusar District